Empson is a surname. Notable people with the surname include:

Derek Empson GBE KCB (1918–1997), Commander-in-Chief Naval Home Command
Ernest Empson (1880–1970), New Zealand pianist and piano teacher
Hetta Empson (1915–1996), South African sculptor
Jackie Empson (born 1974), British former field hockey player
Richard Empson (died 1510), minister of Henry VII, King of England
Ruth Empson, New Zealand physiology academic
Tameka Empson (born 1977), British actress (stage and screen) and comedian
Walter Empson (1856–1934), New Zealand educator
William Empson (1906–1984), English literary critic and poet
William Empson (lawyer) (1791–1852), barrister, professor and journalist

See also
Empson River, river in the Canterbury Region of New Zealand
Seven Types of Ambiguity (Empson), first published in 1930 by William Empson